This is a list of terrorist attacks in France from 1800 to the present. Several 19th-century French rulers were targeted in unsuccessful assassination attempts which killed innocent bystanders.

Since December 1973, terrorist attacks have been taking place regularly over the country, with more than 400 people killed and over 1,700 others injured.

Background

France has a lengthy history of terrorist attacks carried out by a variety of groups from the extreme right, extreme left, extreme Basque, Breton and Corsican nationalists, Algerian insurgent groups and Islamist extremists. Most of the attacks have been bombings utilising improvised explosive devices (IEDs). Anarchists carried out a series of bombings and assassination attempts in the 19th century. A number of attacks associated with the Algerian War took place in the 1950s and 1960s, including the deadliest terrorist attack in France in the 20th century, the 1961 Vitry-Le-François train bombing carried out by the pro-colonialist French nationalist Organisation armée secrète.

Various Middle Eastern factions carried out shootings and bombings in the 1970s and 1980s, mainly in Paris, while during the Algerian Civil War of the 1990s, insurgents associated with the Armed Islamic Group (GIA) carried out a series of major attacks against the Paris public transport system. Nationalist extremists from the Basque, Breton and Corsican communities carried out a number of assassinations and targeted bomb attacks in the 1990s and 2000s. Islamist extremists have carried out numerous attacks in the 2010s, of which the November 2015 Paris attacks have been the bloodiest to date. Although 2015 has been the deadliest year so far in terms of fatalities caused by terrorist attacks, the number of separate terrorist attacks in previous years has been far higher. The highest number of attacks recorded in a single year was 270 in 1996, largely carried out by Algerian Civil War insurgents. The last year without any recorded terrorist attacks was 1971.

List of incidents
Outside France, the terrorist attack with the most French victims was the 19 September 1989 bombing of UTA Flight 772 over Niger, in which 170 people died, 54 of them French citizens.

History

19th century

20th century

21st century

References

 
France
Terrorist incidents
terrorist incidents